The 1895 Duquesne Country and Athletic Club football team was an American football team that represented the Duquesne Country and Athletic Club in the 1895 football season. In their inaugural 1895 season, the team compiled a 4–3–1 record, and won the unofficial Western Pennsylvania Professional Football Circuit championship for the season when they defeated the Pittsburgh Athletic Club on Thanksgiving to end the season.

Schedule

References

Duquesne Country and Athletic Club
Duquesne Country and Athletic Club seasons
Duquesne Country and Athletic Club